Tanah is the Malay/Indonesian word for soil, land or island.

It can be found in topography.

Tanah Datar
Tanah Lot
Tanah Merah (disambiguation)

Indonesian words and phrases
Malay words and phrases